Medellín 2018 was a bid by the city of Medellín and the Comité Olímpico Colombiano to host the 2018 Summer Youth Olympics.

History

Applicant City phase

Medellín bid for the games after successfully hosting the 2010 South American Games and having all the venues already built in the complex Atanasio Girardot. Colombia has never made an Olympic bid before. The country held the 1971 Pan American Games in Cali. In January 2012, Andres Botero Phiillipsbourne was promoted to Sports Minister of Colombia. He is an IOC member and will be working to promote the bid.

Medellín 2018 signed the Youth Olympic Games Candidature Procedure in March 2012.

In July 2012 Juan Camilo Quintero Medina was appointed CEO of the bid.

Candidate City phase

On February 13, 2013, the IOC selected Medellín as one of the three candidate cities for the 2018 Summer Youth Olympic Games.

In June 2013, the IOC Evaluation Commission released their report on the candidate cities and found that Medellín's bid carried minimal risk.

On July 4, 2013, after the voting process, Buenos Aires was selected over Medellin to host the 2018 Summer Youth Olympics. Medellin received 39 votes in the final round and Buenos Aires received 49.

See also
Colombia at the Olympics
Bids for the 2018 Summer Youth Olympics

References

External links
Medellin 2018 Official Website

Sport in Medellín
2018 Summer Youth Olympics bids
Colombia at the Youth Olympics